Godfrey Thornton was Governor of the Bank of England from 1793 to 1795. He had been Deputy Governor from 1791 to 1793. He replaced Samuel Bosanquet as Governor and was succeeded by Daniel Giles.

See also
Chief Cashier of the Bank of England

References

External links

Governors of the Bank of England
Year of birth missing
Year of death missing
British bankers
Deputy Governors of the Bank of England